Harmon Beasley Rowe (August 22, 1923 – January 26, 2002) was an American football player who played at the defensive back and halfback positions.

A native of Livingston, Texas, he played college football for the Baylor Bears and San Francisco Dons. He was selected by the Pittsburgh Steelers in the third round (18th overall pick) of the 1946 NFL Draft. He played professional football in the All-America Football Conference (AAFC) for the New York Yankees from 1947 to 1949 and in the National Football League (NFL) for the New York Giants from 1950 to 1952. He appeared in a total of 59 AAFC and NFL games and tallied 11 interceptions for 162 yards.

References

1923 births
2002 deaths
New York Yankees (AAFC) players
New York Giants players
Baylor Bears football players
San Francisco Dons football players
Players of American football from Texas